Chuqi Chukchu (Quechua chuqi metal, gold (<Aymara), every kind of precious metal, chukchu malaria, "gold malaria", Hispanicized spelling Chuquichuccho) is a  mountain in the Cordillera Central in the Andes of Peru. It is situated in the Lima Region, Huarochiri Province, Chicla District. Chuqi Chukchu lies near the Antikuna mountain pass, northwest of Wayrakancha and northeast of Quñuq P'ukru. The mining village of Q'asa P'allqa (Casapalca) lies at its feet.

References

Mountains of Peru
Mountains of Lima Region